En Passant - Tournée 1998 is a live album by French singer Jean-Jacques Goldman, recorded in 1998 and released in 1999. It was certified platinum in France for sales of 300,000 copies.

Track listing
Disc 1
On ira
Bonne idée
La vie par procuration
Ne lui dis pas 
Tout était dit 
Elle attend
Le rapt 
Pas toi
Elle a fait un bébé toute seule
Le coureur
Là-bas
Natacha 
Quand tu danses
Jeanine médicament blues

Disc 2
À nos actes manqués 
Nos mains 
Je te donne 
Peur de rien (blues) 
Au bout de mes rêves 
Il suffira d'un signe / Quand la musique est bonne 
Sache que je 
Pour que tu m'aimes encore

References

Jean-Jacques Goldman albums
1998 live albums